Zorino is a rural locality in Ryshkovsky Selsoviet Rural Settlement, Kursky District, Kursk Oblast, Russia. Population:

Geography 
The village is located on the Seym River (a left tributary of the Desna), 89 km from the Russia–Ukraine border, at the southern border of Kursk, 1 km from the selsoviet center – Ryshkovo.

 Streets
There are the following streets in the locality: Betonnaya, Dobraya, Druzhnaya, Ivovaya, Khvoynaya, Lesnaya, Peski, Pridorozhnaya, Solovyinaya, Sosnovaya, Tsentralnaya, Verbnaya, Zheleznodorozhnaya and Zolotoy kolos (421 houses).

 Climate
Zorino has a warm-summer humid continental climate (Dfb in the Köppen climate classification).

Transport 

The rural locality is situated 8 km from Kursk Vostochny Airport, 116 km from Belgorod International Airport and 208 km from Voronezh Peter the Great Airport.

References

Notes

Sources

Rural localities in Kursky District, Kursk Oblast